Samuel Gilbert (born 19 August 1986) is a former professional Australian rules footballer who played for the St Kilda Football Club in the Australian Football League (AFL).

Early life
Gilbert was brought up in Terranora in northern New South Wales. His first love as a child was rugby league. His grandfather (Jack Gilbert) and great grandfather (Herb Gilbert) played for St. George Dragons in the New South Wales Rugby Football League Premiership. Herb was also a dual-code rugby international who captained Australia at rugby league. Sam played for the Bilambil Jets in the Group 18 Rugby League on the New South Wales Northern Coast. 

At the age of 14 he moved the Gold Coast, Queensland. He attended Palm Beach Currumbin High School throughout his teenage years. At the age of 15 he began playing Australian Rules at the Tweed Coolangatta JAFC. He made the switch after coming to the realisation that his body type - tall and skinny was not ideally suited to rugby league. He immediately shone, being selected in the Gold Coast representative under-16 team. He played senior football with the Southport Sharks. He missed state selection at under 16 and 18 level being a late bloomer but was selecte as captain of the Under 21 Queensland Scorpions Representative Side that defeated Western Australia attracting the eyes of talend scouts. His 2005 Rising Star award at Southport helped consolidate his prospect in the AFL Draft. Gilbert was selected by the Saints with pick No.33 in the 2005 AFL Draft.

Gilbert is a cousin of former NBL basketball player, Larry Davidson.

AFL career

2006 season
Gilbert was selected by the Saints with pick No.33 in the 2005 AFL Draft. He made his debut for St Kilda in Round 8, 2006 against Carlton.

Gilbert played only one further match in 2006, failing to make a big impact.

His rugby background has led to his physical approach and strong sidestepping and tackling ability.

2007 season
The 2007 season brought further opportunities for Gilbert and he was included for the Round 5 match against Port Adelaide Power, after improved form in St Kilda's VFL affiliated team, the Casey Scorpions. Setting the pattern for his team mates, Gilbert laid seven tackles. He held his spot in the side and improved under coach Ross Lyon, playing every game for the rest of the year.

Gilbert was drafted as a key defender, but his agility and speed has allowed him to play through the midfield and up forward.

2008 season
Gilbert played in St Kilda’s 2008 NAB Cup winning side - the club's third pre-season cup win.

After a statistically strong performance in Round 16, in which Gilbert had 16 kicks, 12 marks and 6 handballs, he was awarded the AFL Rising Star Nomination for that round.

2009 season
Gilbert played in 19 of 22 matches in the 2009 home and away rounds. St Kilda qualified in first position for the 2009 finals series, winning the club’s third minor premiership.

St Kilda qualified for 2009 AFL Grand Final after qualifying and preliminary finals wins. Gilbert played in the grand final in which St Kilda were defeated by 12 points.

2010 season

Gilbert played in 26 games in 2010, including four finals matches, and finished 3rd in St Kilda's Best & Fairest Award (Trevor Barker Medal).

As of the end of the 2010 season, Gilbert had played in 10 AFL finals matches including a grand final

References

External links

1986 births
Living people
Australian rules footballers from New South Wales
St Kilda Football Club players
Southport Australian Football Club players
People from Tweed Heads, New South Wales
Sandringham Football Club players
Australian rules footballers from Queensland
Australia international rules football team players